Dave Morrow (born May 4, 1957) is a Canadian former professional ice hockey player who played in the World Hockey Association (WHA). Drafted in the fourth round of the 1977 NHL amateur draft by the Vancouver Canucks, Morrow opted to play in the WHA after being selected by the Cincinnati Stingers in the second round of the 1977 WHA amateur draft. He played ten games for the Indianapolis Racers during the 1978–79 WHA season. He is the father of Joe Morrow, who was a 2011 first-round draft pick of the Pittsburgh Penguins, and Josh Morrow, who was a 2002 seventh-round pick of the Nashville Predators.

Career statistics

References

External links

1957 births
Calgary Centennials players
Canadian ice hockey defencemen
Canadian ice hockey left wingers
Cincinnati Stingers draft picks
Dallas Black Hawks players
Edmonton Oil Kings (WCHL) players
Fort Wayne Komets players
Indianapolis Racers players
Living people
Portland Winterhawks players
Ice hockey people from Edmonton
Tulsa Oilers (1964–1984) players
Vancouver Canucks draft picks
Canadian expatriate ice hockey players in the United States